Ören Nature Reserve is a nature reserve in Nynäshamn Municipality, Stockholm County in Sweden.

The nature reserve is located in the southern part of Torö island in Stockholm archipelago. It contains sparse Scots pine forest and is a well-known resting spot for migratory birds. The flora contains unusual species such as Crambe maritima, Cakile maritima and Lathyrus japonicus.

References

External links

Nature reserves in Sweden
Geography of Stockholm County
Tourist attractions in Stockholm County